Ronald Donovan Davenport (born December 22, 1962) is a former professional American football fullback in the National Football League. He played for the Miami Dolphins from 1985 to 1989. Davenport was selected by the Dolphins in the sixth round of the 1985 NFL Draft with the 167th overall pick. He scored 11 rushing touchdowns for the Dolphins in his rookie season.

External links
databasefootball.com

1962 births
Living people
Bermudian players of American football
American football fullbacks
Louisville Cardinals football players
Miami Dolphins players
People from Sandys Parish